POU domain, class 3, transcription factor 4 is a protein that in humans is encoded by the POU3F4 gene found on the X chromosome.

POU3F4 is involved in the patterning of the neural tube and both the paraventricular and supraoptic nuclei of the hypothalamus in the developing embryo. During development, POU3F4 is also expressed in the mesenchyme of the periotic bone surrounding the inner ear. A “knockout” mice model displayed that alteration to the POU3F4 gene interrupted this mesenchymal cell differentiation in the superior semicircular canal. The deformities observed in mice were similar to those in humans with X-linked non-syndromic deafness (DFN-3).

Clinical significance 

Genetic testing on various persons has confirmed that mutations of the POU3F4 gene cause X-linked non-syndromic deafness (DFN-3). These known mutations include: 
 Missense mutation causing the substitution of amino acid glycine for glutamic acid at position 216
 A deletion of the POU3F4 gene and 530 more kilobases upstream
 An amino acid substitution of serine for leucine (S228L) in POU3F4
 Frameshift truncation and extension mutations at the POU3F4 C-terminus

Physical anomalies caused by POU3F4 mutations that have been recognized by high resolution computed tomography (HRCT) and magnetic resonance imaging (MRI) include absence of the central axis of the cochlea, an abnormally wide lateral internal auditory canal and a thickened stapes footplate. These anomalies are associated with X-linked non-syndromic deafness.

References

Further reading

External links 
 

POU-domain proteins